Audra Dagelytė (born 26 March 1981) was a Lithuanian sprinter, who mostly competed at 100 m and 200 m running events. She is also Akmenė district politician.

Achievements

Personal bests

References

1981 births
Living people
Lithuanian female sprinters
Universiade medalists in athletics (track and field)
People from Akmenė
Lithuanian politicians
Universiade bronze medalists for Lithuania
Medalists at the 2007 Summer Universiade